Heinrich Adolph Louis Behnke (Horn, 9 October 1898 – Münster, 10 October 1979) was a German mathematician and rector at the University of Münster.

Life and career 
He was born into a Lutheran family in Horn, a suburb of Hamburg. He attended the University of Göttingen and submitted his doctoral thesis to the University of Hamburg. He was noted for work on complex analysis with Henri Cartan and Peter Thullen. His first wife, Aenne Albersheim, was Jewish, but she died soon after the birth of their son. He was concerned about his son's ethnicity during the Nazi period. In 1936 he was elected a member of the Deutsche Akademie der Naturforscher Leopoldina.

Selected publications 
with Peter Thullen: Theorie der Funktionen mehrerer komplexer Veränderlicher, Springer Verlag, Ergebnisse der Mathematik und ihrer Grenzgebiete, 1934, 2nd edn. with collaboration by Reinhold Remmert 1970
with Friedrich Sommer: Theorie der Funktionen einer komplexen Veränderlichen, Springer Verlag, 3rd edn. 1965
Vorlesung über Differentialgeometrie, Münster, Aschendorff, 7th edn. 1966
Vorlesung über gewöhnliche Differentialgleichungen, Münster, Aschendorff, 4th edn. 1963
Vorlesungen über Algebra, Münster, Aschendorff, 3rd edn. 1958
Vorlesungen über Zahlentheorie, Münster, Aschendorff, 5th edn. 1961
Vorlesung über klassische Funktionentheorie, Aschendorff
Vorlesung über Infinitesimalrechnung, Aschendorff

References

External links 
 
Geschichte der Mathematik an der Universität Münster, u.a. Biographie von Behnke, pdf
Author profile in the database zbMATH 

Academic staff of the University of Münster
University of Göttingen alumni
20th-century German mathematicians
1898 births
1979 deaths
Commanders Crosses of the Order of Merit of the Federal Republic of Germany
University of Hamburg alumni
Academic staff of the University of Hamburg